Andrew Joseph Ostrowski (born November 7, 1966) is an American freelance writer, author, and media personality.

He is a weekly columnist with the Am-Pol Eagle, a Buffalo, New York based newspaper, in which he features both a commentary and a question and answer column.

Ostrowski is the Director of Real Live Relic Hunter (RLRH), a film company dedicated to unearthing lost artifacts.

In 2011, Ostrowski unveiled AndrewOstrowski.com, which featured a broad synopsis of his works and interests.

Heritage
Ostrowski is of Polish heritage and a descendant of Polish Szlachta (nobility) on his paternal side. He is the grandson of Antoni Ostrowski of Bialystok, Poland and Maria Turon of Lutcza, Poland.

Writings
Ostrowski began his published writing career in 2001, after returning from his third trip to the Holy Land in Israel. He penned a multi-page narrative taking readers through the entire region amidst its spirituality and conflict. The story was sent to the Staten Island Advance and published in its Worship section. Ostrowski subsequently followed with stories reflecting his trips to Lourdes, France, Czestochowa, Poland, and Rome, Italy, working with then editor Leslie Palma-Simoncek as a "Special to the Advance" contributing columnist. He periodically introduced additional articles on the Catholic Mass, Confession, Biblical Archaeology, and Grace. Ostrowski also composed a detailed article on his collection of crucifixes, tying into his relic hunter nexus.

Ostrowski's fictional efforts include short stories, poetry, and his Strictly Nonsensical Sayings, a collection of whimsical thought sequences. He has also briefly experimented in the horror genre, and is working on a novel. Ostrowski wrote two songs for the French singer Stefan Lawson called Shades of Montesquie and This Side of France.

Ostrowski earned the Silver Medal in the 2007 Decidedly Dickens Festival for his work titled An Evening's Tale at Christmas. Among his short stories, Teardrop of an Eagle detailed the plight of a lost boy during the outbreak of World War II in Poland.

Ostrowski wrote two weekly alternating columns for the Long Island, New York-based Polish American World news until the retirement of its editor, Thomas Poster in April 2011. He continued with the paper through its editorial transition and subsequent scale-down to biweekly status until late October 2011. Ostrowski currently writes two weekly alternating columns for the Am-Pol Eagle news, a commentary called Notes, Quotes, and Polish Life and Just for the Asking in which he fields questions from readers.

Relic Hunter

Ostrowski is a collector of artifacts. His collection includes a variety of cross-cultural artifacts from different historical periods, however he takes an affinity to those of religious significance. His collection of crucifixes has received specific media attention.

Ostrowski cites two sources as the impetus for his interest in relics, Dr. Joseph D. 'Joedy' Smith of the Wagner College Religious Studies department, and Dr. Indiana Jones, the well-known fictional character from the Steven Spielberg/George Lucas quartet of films. In March 2010, Ostrowski stated, "Dr. Smith once found an ancient ring in the desert, which he passed around class for all to see, so it looks like I got my start from a couple of household names, Dr. Joedy Smith and Dr. Indy Jones."

In August 2010, Ostrowski was contacted by independent film producer Paul Vlachos to be part of a documentary on collectors. In October of that year, Ostrowski became Director of Real Live Relic Hunter (RLRH), a pilot project seeking to advance interest in the exploration and discovery of artifacts, antiquities, and relics via a television series. Earlier, in August 2009, Ostrowski attended a Miss Polonia – Staten Island Pageant in New York where he met figure skater Alexandria Riordan (aka Zsa Zsa Riordan) who was also subsequently recruited for Real Live Relic Hunter.

In March 2011, Real Live Relic Hunter offered The Christ Crucified Picture Show: A Lenten Reflection via its website, which exhibited ancient crucifixes from its collection.

Real Live Relic Hunter sparked interest from television production companies such as Cineflix and Halfyard. The team was also in talks with a Japanese television station. In August 2011, Ostrowski was interviewed by British WAGtv for a National Geographic channel production.

Due to increased popularity of Real Live Relic Hunter, Ostrowski along with RLRH modeling actress Celeste Eagleston opened up individual websites, AndrewOstrowski.com and CelesteHealthyLiving.com, respectively, to advance personal interests.

Other interests

Spirituality
Ostrowski is Catholic and a defender of Opus Dei, the Catholic organization founded by Josemaría Escrivá. In addition to Ostrowski's articles on religion and spirituality, he has approached various individual issues in the discipline. He argued against the sub-classification labeling of Catholics as “ultra-conservative” or “liberal”, citing one set of tenets taught by the Catholic Church. He also defended priestly celibacy in the wake of a publicized incident involving Fr. Alberto Cutié, formerly of the Catholic Diocese of Miami. Ostrowski expressed criticism of the Catholic Church's decision to allow Natural Family Planning and also disfavored the Catholic Church's 2011 liturgical revision.

Ostrowski is an abortion opponent, and has written on such spiritual issues as Who Goes to Heaven? and Do Animals have Souls? He is also an advocate for the teachings and witness of Pope John Paul II.

In May 2009, Ostrowski authored a detailed article in the Polish American World in response to the controversy surrounding the death of Pope John Paul I and its alleged ties to Freemasonry. Ostrowski was then confronted and asked by a reader if he himself was a Freemason, for which Ostrowski responded, "Did mason George Washington really chop down a cherry tree?" In a July 2009 issue of the Polish American World, Ostrowski wrote of an alleged conflict between Catholic Freemasons and Opus Dei regarding the Masonic allegiance to a Supreme Being versus the Opus Dei allegiance to Christ, which he further responded to in another reader question. Subsequently, Real Live Relic Hunter scheduled their inaugural site exploration to be a former Masonic Temple hidden in a tunnel beneath New York City.

Ostrowski stated, "For those that scoff and do not consider one iota of what their lives are ultimately about, be it a continuation after death or ceasing with the stopping of a heartbeat, their lives essentially exist in vain."

Vegetarianism and animal welfare

Ostrowski is a vegetarian and proponent of leather alternatives. He expressed criticism of animal shelter euthanasia policies and favors the applicable teachings of Jainism regarding the life of living creatures.

Ostrowski lost his ten-year companion pet cat, Fellas, to illness in August, 2010, stating “I’ve always likened animals to small children. They are helpless, dependent, and go through life very simply and humbly, and by doing so, make us realize our own complicated selves.”

Personal life
Ostrowski is a former competitive road cyclist, having held a United States Cycling Federation international racing license from 1986 to 1994. He competed in a small number of races in France and is an advocate for the Tour de France.

Ostrowski was in a relationship with the daughter of an executive for the French marketing conglomerate Carrefour. When asked in 2010 regarding his bachelor status, he stated: “I don't know, I've always said this issue is not up to me. If you think about all the seemingly random selections of partners people make, it seems this should be left up to the heavens. I guess I'm an old fashioned ‘bump into somebody/love at first sight’ type of person as opposed to a wolf out for the hunt.”

Ostrowski is involved in a media company called Cebula Productions.

He lives in the old West Brighton area of Staten Island, New York.

References

Living people
American television hosts
1966 births
American male writers
People from West New Brighton, Staten Island